René Fournier (born 18 December 1932) is a French former professional racing cyclist. He rode in three editions of the Tour de France.

References

External links
 

1932 births
Living people
French male cyclists
Sportspeople from Seine-Saint-Denis
Cyclists from Île-de-France